Apollon may refer to:
Apollon Smyrnis
Apollon Kalamarias F.C.
Apollon Limassol